Piano, also released as Whisper Not, is an album by jazz pianist Wynton Kelly that was released by Riverside in 1958. Kelly recorded the album with Kenny Burrell, Paul Chambers, and Philly Joe Jones.

Reception
AllMusic gave the album four and a half stars and called it "an important recording" that displays Kelly's "distinctive drive and buoyant swing feel".

Track listing
 All compositions by Wynton Kelly except as indicated
 "Whisper Not" (Benny Golson) – 7:12
 "Action" – 7:12
 "Dark Eyes" (Traditional) – 5:59
 "Strong Man" (Oscar Brown, Jr.) – 5:17
 "Ill Wind" (Harold Arlen, Ted Koehler) – 4:25
 "Don't Explain" (Billie Holiday, Arthur Herzog Jr.) – 5:36
 "You Can't Get Away" – 6:24
 "Dark Eyes" [Take 2] (Traditional) – 5:19

Personnel
 Wynton Kelly – piano
 Kenny Burrell – guitar
 Paul Chambers – double bass
 Philly Joe Jones – drums (1-3, 8)

References

1958 albums
Riverside Records albums
Wynton Kelly albums
albums produced by Orrin Keepnews